KNWR may refer to:

 KNWR (FM), radio station (90.7 FM) in Ellensburg, Washington
 KAFE, a radio station (104.1 FM) in Bellingham, Washington, which held the call sign KNWR from 1979 to 1989
 Kenai National Wildlife Refuge, a wildlife habitat preserve in Alaska